Cameron Akwasi Antwi (born 7 October 2001) is an English professional footballer who plays for Cardiff City as a midfielder.

Early life
Antwi was born in London, England, to Ghanaian parents.

Career
After playing youth football with Fulham, Antwi moved to Blackpool in 2019, turning professional and joining the first-team in July 2020. On 30 November 2020 he moved on loan to Southport until mid-January.

On 8 October 2021, Antwi joined AFC Telford on loan for a month. The loan was subsequently extended until January 2022, although Antwi was re-called by Blackpool on 29 December 2021. He was released by the club at the end of the 2021–22 season.

He signed for Cardiff City in August 2022.

References

2001 births
Living people
Footballers from Greater London
Black British sportsmen
English sportspeople of Ghanaian descent
English footballers
Fulham F.C. players
Blackpool F.C. players
Southport F.C. players
AFC Telford United players
Cardiff City F.C. players
National League (English football) players
Association football midfielders